Triclisia is a genus of flowering plants in the family Menispermaceae.

Species include:

Triclisia angolensis
Triclisia angustifolia
Triclisia calopicrosia
Triclisia capitata
Triclisia coriacea
Triclisia dictyophylla
Triclisia dielsii
Triclisia flava
Triclisia gilletii
Triclisia hypochrysea
Triclisia jumelliana
Triclisia lanceolata
Triclisia loucoubensis
Triclisia louisii
Triclisia lucida
Triclisia macrocarpa
Triclisia macrophylla
Triclisia patens
Triclisia riparia
Triclisia sacleuxii
Triclisia semnophylla
Triclisia subcordata
Triclisia welwitschii

References

 
Medicinal plants
Menispermaceae genera
Taxonomy articles created by Polbot